Razzle Dazzle is a Canadian children's program produced between 1961 and 1966.

Razzle Dazzle may also refer to:

Film and Television
Razzle Dazzle (UK TV series), a BBC television programme for children
Razzle Dazzle: A Journey Into Dance, a 2007 Australian film by Darren Ashton
Razzle Dazzle, a 2008 documentary film and live one-woman show about Mitzi Gaynor
The Hudson Brothers Razzle Dazzle Show, a mid-1970s television show starring the Hudson Brothers

Music
Razzle Dazzle (album), a 2010 album by Buck-Tick
"Razzle Dazzle", a song from the 1975 musical Chicago
"Razzle Dazzle", a song by Deep Purple from Bananas
"Razzle-Dazzle", a 1955 rock and roll song released by Bill Haley & His Comets
"Razzle Dazzle Rose", a song by Camera Obscura from Let's Get Out of This Country
"Razzle Dazzle", a song by Future from Mike WiLL Made-It's album Ransom 2

Other uses
Dazzle camouflage (aka Razzle Dazzle), a camouflage paint scheme used on ships, mainly during World War I
Razzle (game) or Razzle Dazzle, a carnival game
Razzle Dazzle, a ship once owned by Jack London
Razzle Dazzle, an attraction at the Hollycombe Steam Collection in Hampshire, England